Susan M. "Sue" Blinks (born October 5, 1957) is an American dressage rider and trainer. She was best known for riding her Olympic Grand Prix mount Flim Flam. Having represented the United States in an Olympics and two World Equestrian Games, she helped the US Team earn an Olympic Bronze Medal in Sydney, Australia and competed in the 1998 
and 2002  World Equestrian Games.

Blinks spent her teens training with Marianne Ludwig. She worked as Equestrian Director at the University of Massachusetts  and later trained with Walter Christenson in Germany. She also trained with Isabell Werth and Uwe Schulten-Baumer in Germany.

Until 2016, Sue resided in San Diego, CA, riding for Leatherdale Farm. She has since relocated to Florida, where she continues riding and training.

References

 

Living people
1957 births
American female equestrians
Equestrians at the 2000 Summer Olympics
Olympic bronze medalists for the United States in equestrian
American dressage riders
Medalists at the 2000 Summer Olympics
21st-century American women